The 1991 All-Ireland Senior Camogie Championship was won by Kilkenny who defeated Cork by a seven-point margin in the final. The match drew an attendance of 3,024 including President Mary Robinson.

Final
Breda Holmes scored three goals for Kilkenny. Angela Downey’s ingenuity contributed to two of the goals, Marina Downey was the architect of the third. According to Kathryn Davis in the Irish Times:
An emotional Angela Downey, who was beset by cramp in the final minute and who looked as if she would not actually make it up the steps to receive the O'Duffy Cup put it more succinctly when she said: “it was pure stubbornness. We were written off but we came back for one last hurrah.”

Final stages

References

1991 in camogie
1991